"If You Only Let Me In" is a song by British R&B group MN8, released in April 1995 as the second single from their debut album, To the Next Level (1995). It peaked at number six in the UK charts.

Critical reception
In his weekly UK chart commentary, James Masterton wrote, "Their second hit single is if anything even better than the first, more of a proper pop song and an instant radio smash. It crashes in one place higher than its predecessor and certainly deserves to at least match its peak."

Track listings
 7" single / cassette single
 "If You Only Let Me In" (Radio Mix) — 4:03
 "I'll Be Gone" — 4:30

 12" single
 "If You Only Let Me In" (12" Mix) 
 "If You Only Let Me In" (Album Mix)
 "If You Only Let Me In" (Drum Dub)

 CD single
 "If You Only Let Me In" (Radio Mix) — 3:43
 "If You Only Let Me In" (Absolute 12" Mix) — 5:07
 "If You Only Let Me In" (Club Mix) — 7:49
 "I'll Be Gone" — 4:30

Charts

Weekly charts

Year-end charts

References

1995 singles
MN8 songs
1995 songs
Songs written by Arthur Baker (musician)
Columbia Records singles